Bernard Jackson (born July 11, 1959 in Stamford, Connecticut) is an American singer/bassist. He was the frontman for the 1980s/early 1990s R&B band, Surface from 1984 to 1994. He sang on hits like the No. 5 US/#1 US R&B "Shower Me With Your Love" and the No. 1 R&B and pop hit, "The First Time." He released his self-titled debut album in 2000.

Discography

Surface
1986: Surface (Columbia)
1988: 2nd Wave (Columbia)
1990: 3 Deep (Columbia)
1999: Love Zone (Victor Entertainment)

Solo
1997: Bernard Jackson
Bernard Jackson – Bernard Jackson
Label: Kristalyn Records – none
Format: CD, Album 
Country: US
Released: 1997
Genre: Funk / Soul
Style: Soul

Track list
 Intro "Wake Up Call" (H.y.b.)
 There's Only One Like You
 My Life Is You
 I Like What I See
 I Just Wanna Talk To You
 Why
 Hollywood
 Lovers For Life
 Dreams
 You Can Count On Me
 My Story Of Life
 I Will Never Do You Like That
 I'm A Superstar
 Peace

Notes
Kristalyn Records 
1997 PO Box 201 Cheshire CT 06410

2001:  Remember
Bernard Jackson – Remember
Label: Kristalyn Records – 154608
Format: CD, Album 
Country: US
Released: 2001
Genre: Funk / Soul
Style: RnB/Swing, Neo Soul, Contemporary R&B
Track list
 They Don't Know Me
 If This Is Wrong
 Don't Let Go
 Anything
 Don't Give Up
 Always Be Down
 I've Got Love For You
 Your My Life
 I Pledge My Love
 Your My Angel
 Remember
 God Will

2001: What's my Name

References 

1959 births
Living people
Musicians from Stamford, Connecticut
American contemporary R&B singers
20th-century American bass guitarists